The Children’s Movement of Florida is a citizen-led, non-partisan movement to educate political, business and civic leaders – and all parents of the state – about the urgent need to make the well-being and education of infants, toddlers and all other children Florida's highest priority.  The Children's Movement of Florida was launched August 9, 2010 in a four-city fly-around with press conferences in Miami, Orlando, St. Petersburg, and Tallahassee.

Core advocacy issues
The Children's Movement of Florida has identified five areas for a first focus of special interest and action:

 Access to quality health care
 Screening and treatment for children with special needs
 Quality pre-kindergarten opportunities
 High-quality mentoring programs
 High-quality support and information for parents

"Milk Parties"
The movement has scheduled 15 "Milk Party" rallies from September 6 to 30, starting in Pensacola to Key West, to rally support for children as a priority. Participants will be treated to milk and cookies.  "Milk Parties" will feature notable speakers, local celebrities, an educational video, and a "call to action."  The Children's Movement of Florida aims for a thousand or more citizens at each event.

Several Florida publications have referred to The Children's Movement of Florida as the "Milk Party."

Leadership
The Children's Movement of Florida is led by a 27-member steering committee consisting of business, civic and political leaders from across Florida.  Some notable members of 27-member coalition are:

 Carol Jenkins Barnett: President of Publix Supermarket Charities and daughter of George W. Jenkins.
 Sam Bell: Former Florida legislator.
 Allan Bense: Former Florida House Speaker.
 Bob Butterworth: Former Florida attorney general and secretary of the Department of Children and Families.
 Betty Castor: Former Florida legislator and president of the University of South Florida.
 Scott Clemons: Former legislator and now mayor of Panama City, Florida.
 Manny Diaz: Twice elected mayor of Miami.
 Pegeen Hanrahan: Former mayor of Gainesville.
 Toni Jennings: Former lieutenant governor of Florida.
 David Lawrence Jr.: Former publisher of The Miami Herald.
 Roberto Martinez: Former U.S. attorney and now on the State Board of Education.
 Jon Mills: Former Florida House Speaker.
 Sandra Murman: Former Florida legislator from Hillsborough County
 John P. Quinones: Former Florida legislator and now member of the Osceola Board of County Commissioners.
 Nan Rich: Florida state senator.
 Burt Saunders: Former Florida legislator from Collier County.
 Bill Sublette: Former Florida legislator.

References

Organizations based in Florida
Children's rights organizations in the United States